The Hyundai HB20 is a subcompact car produced by South Korean manufacturer Hyundai Motor Company since 2012 in Brazil. It is the first and only Hyundai model strategically developed and produced exclusively for the Brazilian market. Offered with a range of flex-fuel engines, it was not exported to other Latin American countries until 2016, when it began to be sold in Paraguay and Uruguay, and eventually in Mexico in 2022.

"HB" stands for "Hyundai Brasil", while the number "20" is the company’s characterization for vehicles in this segment in line with the similarly sized Hyundai i20.



First generation (HB; 2012) 

It has two engine options, which are 1.0-litre and 1.6 litre. The higher versions do feature a 1.6-litre Gamma engine with 128 hp. The HB20 is available with both automatic and manual transmission for both 1.0-litre and 1.6-litre.

In 2013, over 75% of the HB20 parts are made in Brazil.

HB20S
The Hyundai HB20S is the sedan version of the HB20 hatchback. It has the same engine and transmission choices from the regular HB20.

HB20X 
The Hyundai HB20X is a mini SUV version which sets it apart from the standard HB20. As is the case for other similar models, it is available only with front-wheel drive. It is produced and sold only in Brazil to compete in the expanding mini SUV market.

This version contains mixed use tires, a suspension raised slightly and a few visual upgrades. It is available only with the 1.6-litre Gamma engine.

Concept car 

The Hyundai HB20 R-Spec Concept was presented at the 2014 São Paulo Motor Show.

Safety
The HB20 in its most basic version for Latin America received 3 stars for adult occupants and 1 star for toddlers from Latin NCAP in March 2013.

The updated HB20 in its most basic version for Latin America received 4 stars for adult occupants and 3 stars for toddlers from Latin NCAP in November 2013.

Second generation (BR2; 2019) 

The second generation HB20 was launched on 17 September 2019. It is also available in a crossover-look variant named HB20X.

Facelift 
The facelifted HB20 was released in July 2022 for the 2023 model year.

On 27 September 2022, the HB20 arrived to the Mexican market, replacing the locally-built Accent. Available in both sedan and hatchback body styles, the HB20 is available in three trim levels; GL (sedan only), GL Mid, and GLS. It is also available with an automatic or manual transmission.

Safety
The most basic version for Latin America with 2 airbags and ESC received 1 star for adult occupants and 3 stars for toddlers from Latin NCAP in 2019 (one level above 2010-2015).

The most basic version for Latin America with 2 airbags, driver pretensioner and no ESC received 0 stars from Latin NCAP in 2020 under its new protocol (one level above 2019, similar to Euro NCAP 2014).

References

External links

 Official website

2010s cars
Cars introduced in 2012
Front-wheel-drive vehicles
Hatchbacks
HB20
Sedans
Subcompact cars
Latin NCAP superminis